Amir Zakaria (also Romanized as Amīr Zakarīā, Amīr Zakarīyā, Amīr Z̄akaryā, and Amīr Z̄akareyyā; also known as Mīrzā Karān, Mirzakeran, and Mīrzā Qareh) is a village in Sis Rural District, in the Central District of Shabestar County, East Azerbaijan Province, Iran. At the 2006 census, its population was 952, in 284 families.

References 

Populated places in Shabestar County